23 Vulpeculae is a triple star system in the northern constellation of Vulpecula. It is visible to the naked eye as a faint, orange-hued star with an apparent visual magnitude of 4.52 and it is located approximately 327 light years away from the Sun based on parallax. The system is moving further from the Earth with a heliocentric radial velocity of +1.47 km/s.

This star has 2.4 times the mass of the Sun and is radiating 146 times the Sun's luminosity from its enlarged photosphere at an effective temperature of 4,429 K. Its companion, component Ab, has magnitude 6.5. The tertiary member, component B, has a separation of 0.26" and a magnitude of 6.94.

References

External links
 

K-type giants
Triple star systems
Vulpecula
Durchmusterung objects
Vulpeculae, 23
192806
099874
7744